Kaalol is one of the 182 Legislative Assembly constituencies of Gujarat state in India. It is part of Panchmahal district.

List of segments
This assembly seat represents the following segments,

 Kalol Taluka
 Ghoghamba Taluka (Part) Villages – Jorapura (Vangarva), Vangarva, Shaniyada, Ranipura (Damavav), Damavav, Khilodi, Rinchhwani, Albeta, Khan Patla, Sajora, Padedi, Simaliya, Jambuvaniya, Guneshiya, Kothayadi, Sherpura, Damanpura, Dantol, Bhilod, Gajipura (Kanpur), Kantaveda, Bhojpura, Goya Sundal, Kothara, Vav kulli, Chathi, Bor, Chatha, Kantu, Malu, Kanpur, Navagam, Jorapura (Davadra), Davadra, Mulani Kapadi, Gajapura (Kantu), Gundi, Khadpa, Gorada, Ambakhunt, Uncha Beda, Kharod, Gamani, Galibili, Godli, Vanskod, Nurapura, Ghogha

Members of Legislative Assembly

Election results

2022

2017

2012

See also
 List of constituencies of Gujarat Legislative Assembly
 Gujarat Legislative Assembly

References

External links
 

Assembly constituencies of Gujarat
Panchmahal district